John Coakley is an emeritus professor in the School of Politics & International Relations at University College Dublin, where he was formerly director of the Institute of British-Irish Studies. He also holds the title of Distinguished International Professor at Queen's University Belfast. He specialises in the study of Irish politics, comparative politics and ethnic conflict. He was vice president of the International Social Science Council between 2002 and 2006, and was Secretary General of the International Political Science Association from 1994 until 2000.

Selected published works
Coakley, J (2013) Reforming political institutions: Ireland in comparative perspective. Dublin: Institute of Public Administration.
Coakley, J (2012) Nationalism, ethnicity and the state: making and breaking nations. London: Sage.
Coakley, J; Trent, J; (2000) History of the International Political Science Association (with John Trent). Dublin: International Political Science Association.
Coakley, J; (2000) Handbook of the International Political Science Association. Dublin: International Political Science Association.

References

External links
John Coakley's homepage

Irish political scientists
Year of birth missing (living people)
Living people